The Harrien County ( or ,) was one of the four counties of the Governorate of Estonia. It was situated in the central part of the governorate (in present-day northern Estonia). Its capital was Reval (Tallinn), which was the capital of the governorate as well. The territory of Kreis Harrien corresponds to the present-day Harju County and most parts of Rapla County.

Demographics
At the time of the Russian Empire Census of 1897, Kreis Harrien had a population of 157,736. Of these, 82.9% spoke Estonian, 7.3% German, 6.8% Russian, 0.7% Swedish, 0.7% Yiddish, 0.7% Polish, 0.2% Latvian, 0.2% Finnish, 0.1% Belarusian and 0.1% Ukrainian as their native language.

References

External links

 
Uezds of Estland Governorate